Oberglatt railway station is a railway station in the Swiss canton of Zurich and municipality of Oberglatt. It is located at the junction of the standard gauge Oerlikon–Bülach and Wehntal lines of Swiss Federal Railways, and is served by Zürich S-Bahn lines S3, S9, and S15.

Services 
The following services stop at Oberglatt:

 Zürich S-Bahn

References

External links 
 
 

Railway stations in the canton of Zürich
Swiss Federal Railways stations